Amanda Lepore is an American model, singer, and performance artist. A former Club Kid, she has appeared in advertising for numerous companies. Lepore is noted as a regular subject in photographer David LaChapelle's work, serving as his muse, as well as many other photographers, such as Terry Richardson and Ruben van Schalm. She participated in LaChapelle's Artists and Prostitutes 1985–2005 exhibit in New York City, where she "lived" in a voyeuristic life-sized set.

Lepore has released several singles, many written by and/or recorded with Cazwell. In 2011, she released her debut studio album, I...Amanda Lepore, on Peace Bisquit.

Early life 
Amanda grew up in the Essex County community of Cedar Grove, New Jersey, with one sibling, an older brother. Her father was an Italian-American chemical engineer, and her mother was a German-American housewife. Her mother had schizophrenia and spent much time in mental institutions. Lepore later wrote that "Ever since I can first remember, I knew I was a girl. I couldn't understand why my parents were dressing me up in boys' clothing. I thought they were insane."

When she was 15-years old, Lepore befriended a transgender dancer named Bambi. Lepore then started making costumes for Bambi in exchange for female hormones. Having already grown isolated from her peers and schooling, her parents withdrew her from public school and hired a private tutor. They also took her to a psychologist, who helped her obtain a prescription to begin hormone therapy.

At the age of 17, and through a legal loophole, Lepore married a male bookstore owner. She was granted permission for gender affirmation surgery, which she had at age 19 in Yonkers, New York. Lepore later left her husband. In 1989, she relocated to New York City.

In the early 1990s, Lepore tried to establish herself as a nightlife figure (including being a member of the Club Kids). She supported herself by working in a nail salon, as a dominatrix, and later as a cosmetics salesgirl for Patricia Field. After meeting photographer David LaChapelle one evening while hosting at Bowery Bar, she began collaborating with him.

Modeling and acting 
Lepore has appeared in fashion magazines, including French Playboy, Ponytail, DAMn and TUSH. She is on the cover of Lords of Acid's 1999 album Expand Your Head and on Thighpaulsandra's 2006 album The Lepore Extrusion.

Because of her association with the Club Kids, Lepore had a cameo in the documentary Party Monster: The Shockumentary (1998) and the feature film Party Monster (2003). She can be seen briefly in the fashion spoof comedy Zoolander (2001). She was featured in the documentary Dig! (2004) and in Another Gay Sequel (2008). In 2016, Lepore had a major role in José André Sibaja'''s film The Zanctuary, where she played a drug dealer called Miss Divine. Other cast members included Joey Arias and Sophia Lamar, with whom she also appeared in 2018 documentary I Hate New York from Spanish director Gustavo Sanchez.

Lepore has had cameos in music videos for artists including Elton John, Thalía, The Dandy Warhols, Girl in a Coma, Grace Jones, Keanan Duffty, Sharon Needles, TIGA (for his cover of "Sunglasses at Night"), and the alt rock band The Drums (for "Days"). Lepore appears in many of Cazwell's music videos, including "Watch my Mouth" and "All Over Your Face".

She was Chief of Parade at the 2010 Sydney Gay and Lesbian Mardi Gras in Australia.

 Book 
On April 18, 2017, Lepore released her autobiography, Doll Parts. It was co-written with Thomas Flannery Jr. and published through Regan Arts. The book features numerous pictures of Amanda by photographers such as David LaChapelle, Tina Paul, Josef Jasso, Rob Lebow (who photographed the cover), and Joey Falsetta.

 Music 
Lepore's first single, "Deeper," was a 2003 trance dance song written by Wigstock drag queen Lady Bunny.

In 2005, Lepore released her first album, Introducing... Amanda Lepore, which contained "Champagne" and "My Hair Looks Fierce". In 2007, she released two remix albums, Fierce Pussy and My Pussy E.P. Lepore performed the main title for Another Gay Movie, "I Know What Boys Like" and "Cotton Candy" from the soundtrack of Another Gay Sequel.

Lepore was a part of True Colors Tour 2007, a 15-city North American benefit tour sponsored by the Logo channel, hosted by comedian Margaret Cho and headlined by Cyndi Lauper. The tour benefited the Human Rights Campaign, PFLAG and the Matthew Shepard Foundation, and it included Erasure, Debbie Harry, The Gossip, Rufus Wainwright, The Dresden Dolls, The MisShapes, Rosie O'Donnell, Indigo Girls, The Cliks, and other special guests. In 2009, Lepore performed at the Majestic Theatre during Metro Pride Fest in Detroit with The Divas of the Majestic: A Divine Lites Productions and Founder, Electra Lites.

In June 2011, Lepore released her full-length album I...Amanda Lepore at the Highline Ballroom with Cazwell, Kat Deluna, Neon Hitch, Ana Matronic, Jonté, and many others. Her debut full-length album I...Amanda Lepore was released in 2011 on Peace Bisquit.

In 2013, her version of the Marilyn Monroe song "I Wanna Be Loved by You" was released through Peace Bisquit.

In 2014, Lepore was featured on drag performer Sharon Needles' single, "I Wish I Were Amanda Lepore", and she guest starred in the music video for the track, depicting Needles as a fan obsessed with getting plastic surgery to look like her.

In 2015, she collaborated with Alek Sandar in his song "P.O.R.N.", even appearing in the cover of the single and in the music video.

On July 31, 2015, she released the remix album I... Amanda Lepore – Make over sessions. This album included 2 digital CDs that contained remixes of her first studio album I... Amanda Lepore, released four years prior.

On December 8, 2017, the song "Buckle Up" was released from her forthcoming EP Lepore.'', which was released on February 16, 2018. The EP contained four new songs: "Buckle Up", "My Panties", "The Jean Genie", and "Too Drunk to Fuck".

Merchandise 
In October 1999, Swatch released "Time Tranny", a watch designed by LaChapelle with Lepore on the face, which displays a printed crack on the glass and marble stripes as the background. A second version displays no cracked glass and a blue and yellow striped background.

In April 2006, Integrity Toys launched an Amanda Lepore doll produced by Jason Wu as a benefit for AIDS charities.

Lepore has a line of cosmetics in partnership with CAMP Cosmetics, called "Collection Lepore", as well as a signature perfume.

Filmography

Television

Discography

Studio albums

EPs

Singles

Videography

See also 
 Conceptual art
 LGBT culture in New York City
 List of LGBT people from New York City

Notes

References

External links 

 

1967 births
Living people
American people of German descent
American people of Italian descent
Club Kids
Nightlife in New York City
LGBT people from New Jersey
People from Cedar Grove, New Jersey
Transgender women musicians
Transgender female models
American LGBT singers
American women in electronic music
Muses
21st-century LGBT people
Transgender singers